Hemiksem (historical spellings Heymissen and Hemixem) is a municipality located in the Belgian province of Antwerp. The municipality only comprises the town of Hemiksem proper. In 2021, Hemiksem had a total population of 11,722. The total area is 5.44 km².

History 
The village was first mentioned in 1155 as Hamincsem. In 1246, Cistercian monks established St. Bernard's Abbey, Hemiksem near the Scheldt, and became Lords of the heerlijkheid (landed estate) Hemiksem. The area used to be heavily forest. In 1358, the first brickworks was established, but it was an agricultural area until the 19th century. During the 19th century, Hemiksem started to industrialise and grow.

Sights
The most notable sight in Hemiksem is the 13th century St. Bernard's Abbey, which now houses the town hall and police headquarters, after having undergone extensive renovations in the past decade.

Gallery

References

External links
 
  Official website

 
Municipalities of Antwerp Province
Populated places in Antwerp Province